UN Plaza is a residential building located on Piața Națiunile Unite in Bucharest. It has 18 floors and a surface of 20,000 m2.

References

External links
 Photo on Panoramio

Residential skyscrapers in Bucharest

Residential buildings completed in 1978